Honda Odyssey was a line of single-seat four-wheel all-terrain vehicles produced by the Honda Motor Company between 1977 and 1989.

First generation FL250 (1977 - 1980)
The first generation Honda Odyssey can be identified by the yellow body with the black roll bar and no front bumper. Lack of suspension in the rear caused problems with stress cracks in the frame and handling in rough terrain. Heating issues were also an issue with this model. In 1980 the head light was moved from the front rack to the top of the roll bar and the 6 volt system was changed to a 12 volt system. Options included a rear tote rack, chevron pattern tires, and trailer hitch.

Second generation FL250 (1981 - 1984)
In 1981, the second generation Honda Odyssey was introduced. Although mechanically identical to the first generation, Honda changed the look of the Odyssey by changing the colors to Honda Red and adding a full cage roll-bar. Other improvements included improved shoulder harness padding, 60 watt rectangular headlight mounted high on the roll-bar, improved water resistance in the torque converter, larger capacity fuel filter, capacitor ignition(CDI), roll bar mounted air intake, and redesigned steering geometry allowing larger front shock absorbers and tighter turning radius.

Specifications (FL250)

Length:   
Width:   
Height:  1977-1980 - , 1981-1984 -  to top of roll bar 
Wheelbase:  
Turning Radius: 1977-80 - , 1981–84 -  
Ground clearance:  
Maximum Climbing Angle: 35 degrees 
Dry weight:  1977-1979 - , 1980 - , 1981-1984 -    
Engine: Piston port two-stroke single 
Bore:  ,   
Stroke:   
Displacement:   
Compression ratio:  6.6:1
Carburetor:  -throat Keihin 
Starter:  Recoil
Ignition: 1977-1980 - Flywheel Magneto, 1981-1984 - Capacitor Discharge 
Idle Speed: 1500 rpm
Spark Plug: NGK BR7ES
Transmission:  V-belt torque converter
Wheels: Steel
Front:  
Rear:  
Tires:  
Front:  20x7x8 
Rear:   22x11x8 
Brakes:
 Rear self-adjusting cable actuated disk
 Parking rear cable actuated shoe and drum
Suspension:
Front    Trailing arms with Hydraulic shock
Rear     Solid axle
Headlights: 1977-79 - 6V-35W, 1980 - 12V-45W, 1981-84 - 12V-60W
Taillight: 1977-79 - none, 1980 - 12V-3W for Canadian Models Only, 1981-84 - 12V-3W

VIN Identification FL250

Honda used an independent VIN system of their own design for FL250 Odysseys and the following is their breakdown by year.
 1977: FL250*1000001 – 1011921
 1978: FL250*1100001 – 1112345
 1979: FL250*2000001 – 2012620
 1980: TB04*2000001 – 2006315
 1981: TB040*BC400001 – BC406324
 1982: TB040*CC500001 – CC514700
 1983: TB040*DC600001 – DC617555
 1984: TB040*EC700051 – EC703225

FL350R (1985)
Scheduled to appear in spring 1984, the FL350R was delayed until early 1985. The engine was mounted behind the driver, and featured 6.7:1 compression, capacitor discharge ignition a -throat Keihin carburetor, and added electric starting. To improve stability, track was increased in 1985, to  front and  rear. Wheel travel is to  front,  rear. In addition, mechanical disc brakes were replaced with dual hydraulic drums in front and a single hydraulic rear disc. The transmission was a variable-pitch torque converter with one speed forward and one reverse. The FL350 was replaced by the FL400 Pilot in 1989.

Specifications (FL350)

Length:   
Width:   
Height:   to top of roll cage
Wheelbase:   
Ground clearance:   
Dry weight:   
Engine:  
Bore:  ,  after recall 
Stroke:   
Displacement:  ,  after recall 
Compression ratio:  6.6:1
Carburetor:  -throat Keihin
Fuel: Premix 20:1 with a minimum of 89 octane 
Transmission:  torque converter, one speed forward, one reverse, plus neutral
Wheels: steel
Front:  , 4 on  bolt pattern
Rear:  , 4 on  bolt pattern
Tires:  Ohtsu
Front:  21x7x10 RT101
Rear:   24x11x10 RT502
Starter: Electric and recoil
Ignition: Solid state CD
Clutch: Automatic
Transmission: V-belt torque converter with F/N/R gearbox
Suspension: 
Front: Dual-trailing arms w/hydraulic shocks, 4.3 inches of travel
Rear: Diagonal link-type w/gas charged shocks, 5.9 inches of travel
Brakes: 
Front: Dual hydraulic drums
Rear: Hydraulic disc

References

Odyssey (ATV)